NJ Transit Bus Operations is the bus division of NJ Transit, providing bus service throughout New Jersey along with service along one light rail line, with many routes going to New York City and Philadelphia.

History 
Prior to 1948, most public transportation in New Jersey was provided by the Public Service Corporation of New Jersey, a utility company that also operated the Public Service Railway division. In 1948, the Public Service Corporation was divided into two entities: the Public Service Electric and Gas Company, which inherited the utility operations, and the Public Service Coordinated Transportation Company (PSCT), which inherited the transit operations. PSCT provided service throughout New Jersey, originally using trolleys and then transitioning to trolley buses, and buses. During the 1970s, the New Jersey Department of Transportation began subsidizing the routes of Public Service, now renamed Transport of New Jersey (TNJ), contracting with TNJ and other companies to operate local bus service throughout New Jersey.

NJ Transit came into being as the result of the New Jersey Public Transportation Act of 1979 to "acquire, operate, and contract for transportation services in the public interest".  NJ Transit Bus Operations came into being the following year, when it acquired Transport of New Jersey from PSE&G.  Other purchases and buyouts in the 1980s expanded the bus division of NJ Transit, including the assumption of service for Somerset Bus Company in 1982 the acquisition of the Atlantic City Transportation Company in 1987. In 1992 NJ Transit Mercer, Inc., which was the successor to the former "Mercer Metro" operation in the Trenton and Princeton areas, was folded into NJ Transit Bus Operations. In 2010, Morris County operations were taken over under the subsidiary NJ Transit Morris, Inc.

NJ Transit Bus Operations owns, leases, or subleases over 3,000 buses, and many more have been purchased for community shuttles.

Routes 
Routes are numbered by where they operate in the state of New Jersey, however, there are a few exceptions to the general rule due to subsequent changes to some routes operating in Central and North Jersey. Fare and route can also be further elucidated on some of the individual route schedules or the trip planner.

1-99: Intrastate service originating from Newark, Jersey City, Hoboken, or Elizabeth.
100-199: Routes from central and northern New Jersey to New York City.
200-299: No routes with these numbers; a few existed in the 1980s but were soon renumbered.
300-399: Special-event and park services, park-and-ride services, long-distance suburban routes from Philadelphia, New York-Atlantic City express. Beginning in 2010, numbers in this series are also assigned to North Jersey intrastate routes formerly suffixed with an X.
400-449: Short-distance suburban routes in southwestern New Jersey and to Philadelphia.
450-499: Local routes within Camden, Gloucester, and Salem counties.
500-549: Local routes within Atlantic and Cape May counties.
550-599: Long-distance routes from Atlantic City serving points in southern New Jersey and Philadelphia.
600-699: Local routes within Mercer County.
700-799: Local routes within Passaic and Bergen counties not running to Newark.
800-880: Local routes within Middlesex, Monmouth, and Morris counties not running to Newark.
Wheels Suburban Transportation Services (890 and up).

In most cases, routes retain the same numbers they had under the Public Service/Transport of New Jersey umbrella.

Fleet

Divisions, facilities, and operators 
NJ Transit Bus Operations is divided into the Northern, Central, and Southern Divisions, and contract operations. Below is a list of all facilities and the buses housed in them.

Northern Division 
The Northern Division consists of seven garages.

Central Division 
The Central Division consists of five garages and one light rail operations facility.

Southern Division 
The Southern Division consists of four garages.

Contract operations 
These companies operate service under contract to New Jersey Transit. Service is provided using New Jersey Transit-branded buses.

See also 
NJ Transit Rail Operations

References

External links 

New Jersey Transit official website
Unofficial New Jersey Transit fan page
Unofficial New Jersey Transit bus map

 
Surface transportation in Greater New York
Bus transportation in New Jersey
Bus transportation in New York (state)
Bus transportation in Pennsylvania